Lepri is a surname. Notable people with the surname include:

Adalberto Lepri (1929–2014), Italian wrestler
Lucas Lepri (born 1984), Brazilian grappler
Stanislao Lepri (1905–1980), Italian painter and diplomat